Red Alert is the debut album by the Poway, California punk rock band Agent 51, released by Alphabet Records in 1998. It established the band's presence in the local punk rock scene. Some of the songs and the album artwork detail the band's fascination with UFOs, extraterrestrials and the possible coverup of their existence by the United States government. An independent music video was filmed for the title track.

After the song "San Diego's Burning" the album has 31 blank tracks, then at 0:51 into track 51 there is a "hidden" semi-instrumental version of "Red Alert," with vocals only on the chorus. After the song, on the same track, there is a clip from the "Area 51" radio program.

Track listing

Tracks 20–50 each consist of 4–6 seconds of silence.

Personnel
Chris "Broken" Armes - guitar, vocals
Eric "Airwick" Davis - guitar, vocals
Greg Schneider - bass, vocals
Rob Hunter - drums

Production
Record label: Alphabet Records
Recorded at DML Studios November 24–26, 1997 by Scott Exum
Mastered at DML Studios
Produced by Agent 51
All songs copyright 1996-1997 Agent 51, except "Swingin' Doors" by Merle Haggard
Cover design by Agent 51
Layout by David Klinker

References

1998 albums
Agent 51 albums